An immaculate inning occurs in baseball when a pitcher strikes out all three batters he faces in one inning  using the minimum possible number of pitches: nine.  

Major League Baseball has seen 112 immaculate innings, including the first by John Clarkson of the Boston Beaneaters against the Philadelphia Quakers on June 4, 1889; and the most recent by Enyel De Los Santos of the Cleveland Guardians on September 27, 2022.  Use of the term "immaculate inning" first appeared in newspaper reporting after 2000.

Seven pitchers have accomplished the feat more than once in their career, including Hall-of-Famers Lefty Grove, Sandy Koufax, Nolan Ryan, and Randy Johnson, and currently active pitchers Chris Sale, Max Scherzer, and Kevin Gausman.  Koufax, Sale, and Scherzer are the only pitchers to achieve an immaculate inning three times. 

Of the 102 pitchers who have accomplished the feat, 78 have been right-handed and 24 left-handed. Five pitchers – Bob Gibson, Johnson, Pedro Martínez, Ryan, and Scherzer – are also members of the 3,000 strikeout club. Sloppy Thurston, Ryan, Wade Miley, Thomas Pannone, Reid Detmers, and Hayden Wesneski are the only rookies to have attained the milestone. Ryan and Gausman have struck out three batters on nine pitches in both the American League and National League.

Danny Jackson is the sole player to pitch an immaculate inning in the World Series: the seventh inning of Game 5 of the 1985 World Series. Jackson pitched a complete game, winning 6–1 an staving off elimination for the Kansas City Royals, who eventually won the series in seven games.

While an immaculate inning typically occurs with the bases empty, a nine-pitch, three-strikeout performance can also be accomplished by a relief pitcher who enters the game with one or more runners on base. On May 8, 2014, when Brad Boxberger of the Tampa Bay Rays entered a game against the Baltimore Orioles with the bases loaded. No player has ever struck out four batters on 12 pitches in an inning, with one of those batters reaching base on an uncaught third strike.

No pitcher has thrown more than one immaculate inning in a game. Jesús Sánchez of the Florida Marlins came within one pitch of that feat on September 13, 1998. Facing the Atlanta Braves, Sánchez struck out the side in the bottom of the second inning on 10 pitches, threw an immaculate inning in the bottom of the third inning, and struck out the first batter he faced in the fourth: seven consecutive strikeouts on 25 pitches. Just one game has seen two pitchers throw immaculate innings: on June 15, 2022, Phil Maton and Luis Garcia of the Houston Astros struck out the same three Rangers batters in different innings.

Frequency by decade

The frequency of immaculate innings has varied widely through baseball history. There were only 31 immaculate innings in the 114 Major League seasons from 1876 to 1989, but another 31 in the 20 seasons from 1990 to 2009.  The pace has since picked up even more, with 43 immaculate innings in the 12 seasons from 2010 to 2021.

Updated through Enyel De Los Santos's immaculate inning of September 27, 2022.

Players

See also 

 List of Major League Baseball single-inning strikeout leaders
 Nine-dart finish

Notes

References
General

Specific

Major League Baseball statistics
Striking out the t